Shekar Krishnan (born June 5, 1985) is an American attorney and politician who is a member of the New York City Council for the 25th district, which covers the northwestern Queens neighborhoods of Jackson Heights, Elmhurst, and parts of East Elmhurst.

Early life
Krishnan was born to immigrant parents from Kerala, India.

He received a Bachelor of Sciences in engineering from The Cooper Union and a Juris Doctor from the University of Michigan Law School.

Career
Krishnan worked as an attorney at Brooklyn Legal Services Corporation A, directing the organization’s fair housing and tenant advocacy divisions. He is the co-founder of Communities Resist, a legal services organization that represents tenants and neighborhood coalitions in fair housing litigation and anti-displacement advocacy in gentrified neighborhoods.

Before his election to City Council, Shekar Krishnan was a long-time community activist in Jackson Heights/Elmhurst and civil rights lawyer fighting housing discrimination and neighborhood displacement.

Shekar co-founded Communities Resist, a legal services organization highly acclaimed citywide for its community-rooted, intersectional approach to housing and racial justice in North Brooklyn and Queens. He represented tenants and neighborhood coalitions in fair housing litigation and anti-displacement advocacy in some of the most gentrified neighborhoods in NYC. Shekar began his legal career with the landmark Broadway Triangle fair housing struggle against the City of New York, a successful case challenging a rezoning under the Fair Housing Act. He also co-founded Friends of Diversity Plaza. Located on the border of Elmhurst and Jackson Heights, Diversity Plaza has become a national symbol of how public space can bring people together.

2021 City Council campaign

Krishnan announced his candidacy in the 2021 Democratic primary for the 25th District of the New York City Council on November 17, 2020. Incumbent Councilmember Daniel Dromm was term-limited and could not run for re-election. He was endorsed by Dromm, U.S. Representative Nydia Velazquez, and State Senators Julia Salazar and John Liu. He centered his campaign on immigrant rights, the taxi medallion crisis, affordable housing, and climate justice.

Krishnan won the ranked-choice primary with 53.4% of all votes cast. He won the general election with 60% of the vote. Along with Shahana Hanif, Krishnan will be one of the first South Asians to serve in the New York City Council. Days after being elected, Krishnan was arrested along with Hanif and Assemblymember Zohran Mamdani for protesting alongside taxi drivers.

Electoral history

Personal life

Shekar is the son of immigrants from South India. He is also a father of two small children and husband to Zoe, an immigration public defender and reproductive justice advocate. Krishnan lives in his District 25 of Jackson Heights with his family.

See also
 Indian Americans in New York City

References

1985 births
Asian-American New York City Council members
Living people
Politicians from Queens, New York
Cooper Union alumni
New York (state) Democrats
American politicians of Indian descent
Asian-American people in New York (state) politics
21st-century American politicians
University of Michigan Law School alumni